Peter Breen may refer to:

 Peter Breen (figure skater) (born 1969), American ice dancer
 Peter Breen (Australian politician) (born 1947), former Australian politician
 Peter Breen (Illinois politician), member of the Illinois State House of Representatives

See also
 Peter W. Breene (1846–1926), Colorado politician